Kaimar Saag (born 5 August 1988) is an Estonian professional footballer who plays as a striker for Paide Linnameeskond.

Club career

Levadia
At the age of 16, Saag started his professional career with Levadia. He scored his first Meistriliiga goal on 16 October 2005, in the 28th minute of a 2–3 victory over Merkuur. In 2007 Meistriliiga season, he had a short loan with Tallinna Kalev where he scored once in 14 games. At the age of 19, after three seasons in Levadia, Saag moved abroad.

Silkeborg
On 25 January 2008, he signed a 4-year contract with Danish 1st Division club Silkeborg. Seven days later, Saag played his first game for Silkeborg against Aarhus. He scored his first goal for Silkeborg on 6 April 2008, in a 2–1 victory against Fredericia. In April 2012, after spending four and a half years at the club, he announced his intention to leave the club due to limited play time.

Vejle Kolding
In May 2012, Saag signed a two-year contract with Danish side Vejle Kolding and joined the team later in the summer after his contract expired at Silkeborg. He started well at his new club, scoring seven goals in pre-season matches. On 29 July 2012, he made league debut for the club in a 1–1 draw against Køge. A week later on his birthday, 5 August, Saag scored a hat-trick and helped his side beat Skive 4–1.

Assyriska

In July 2014, Saag signed a one-year contract with Swedish Superettan club.

B36 Torshavn
In January 2018, Saag moved to Faroe Islands' club B36 Tórshavn. Saag left the club again at the end of 2018 and then went to train at his former youth club Viljandi SK, just to hold his form.

International career
For Estonia national football team, Saag is capped 46 times. He made his national team debut on 8 September 2007 against Croatia national football team in a UEFA Euro 2008 qualification.

He scored his first goal for the national team on 30 December 2009, in a friendly match against Angola.

International goals

Honours

Club
Levadia
 Meistriliiga: 2006, 2007
 Estonian Cup: 2004–05, 2006–07
 Estonian Supercup: 2015

B36 Tórshavn
 Faroe Islands Cup: 2018

Individual
 Esiliiga top goalscorer: 2006

References

External links
 
 
 
 

1988 births
Living people
Sportspeople from Viljandi
Estonian footballers
FCI Levadia Tallinn players
JK Tallinna Kalev players
Estonia international footballers
Silkeborg IF players
Vejle Boldklub Kolding players
Assyriska FF players
B36 Tórshavn players
Estonian expatriate footballers
Expatriate men's footballers in Denmark
Estonian expatriate sportspeople in Denmark
Expatriate footballers in Sweden
Estonian expatriate sportspeople in Sweden
Expatriate footballers in Norway
Estonian expatriate sportspeople in Norway
Expatriate footballers in the Faroe Islands
Estonian expatriate sportspeople in the Faroe Islands
FCI Levadia U21 players
Association football forwards
Viljandi JK Tulevik players
Meistriliiga players